The 1975–76 Divizia A was the fifty-eighth season of Divizia A, the top-level football league of Romania.

Teams

League table

Results

Top goalscorers

Champion squad

See also 
 1975–76 Divizia B
 1975–76 Divizia C
 1975–76 County Championship

References

Liga I seasons
Romania
1975–76 in Romanian football